Manchester is a city in Northwest England. The M13 postcode area is to the south of the centre of the city and includes parts of the districts of Chorlton-on-Medlock and Longsight. The postcode area contains 38 listed buildings that are recorded in the National Heritage List for England. Of these, one is listed at Grade I, the highest of the three grades, seven are at Grade II*, the middle grade, and the others are at Grade II, the lowest grade. The area includes the main buildings of the University of Manchester, some of which are listed, as are some hospitals. The area is otherwise mainly residential, and the other listed buildings include houses, some of which have been converted for other uses, churches and chapels, public houses, former public baths, a museum, a milepost, railings, a statue, and a war memorial.


Key

Buildings

References

Citations

Sources

Lists of listed buildings in Greater Manchester
Buildings and structures in Manchester